Secret Police is a 1929 German crime film directed by Edmund Heuberger and starring Anton Pointner, Eddie Polo, and Rina Marsa. It was shot at the Johannisthal Studios in Berlin and on location in Wannsee. The film's art direction was by Gustav A. Knauer and Willy Schiller. It was released by the German subsidiary of Universal Pictures.

Cast

References

External links
 

1929 films
Films of the Weimar Republic
Films directed by Edmund Heuberger
Universal Pictures films
German black-and-white films
1920s German films
Films shot at Johannisthal Studios
1929 crime films
German crime films